Psilocybe acutipilea is a species of mushroom-forming fungus in the family Hymenogastraceae. It was discovered in October 1881 in Apiahy, Sao Paulo State, Brazil by Carlos Spegazzini, and described by him as a new species of Deconica in 1889. Gastón Guzmán transferred it to Psilocybe in 1978, but Ramirez-Cruz considered it a possible synonym of Psilocybe mexicana, but the type specimen was too moldy for them to be certain.

See also
List of Psilocybin mushrooms
Psilocybin mushrooms

References

Entheogens
Psychoactive fungi
acutipelia
Psychedelic tryptamine carriers
Fungi of North America
Fungi described in 1889